The following outline is provided as an overview of and topical guide to finance:

Finance – addresses the ways in which individuals and organizations raise and allocate monetary resources over time, taking into account the risks entailed in their projects.

Overview 
The term finance may incorporate any of the following:
 The study of money and other assets
 The management and control of those assets
 Profiling and managing project risks

Fundamental financial concepts 
 Finance
 Arbitrage
 Capital (economics)
 Capital asset pricing model
 Cash flow
 Cash flow matching
 Debt
 Default
 Consumer debt
 Debt consolidation
 Debt settlement
 Credit counseling
 Bankruptcy
 Debt diet
 Debt-snowball method

 Debt of developing countries
Asset types
 Real Estate
 Securities
 Commodities
 Futures
 Cash
 Discounted cash flow
 Financial capital
 Funding
 Entrepreneur
 Entrepreneurship
 Fixed income analysis
 Gap financing
 Global financial system
 Hedge
 Basis risk
 Interest rate
 Risk-free interest rate
 Term structure of interest rates
 Short-rate model
 Vasicek model
 Cox–Ingersoll–Ross model
 Hull–White model
 Chen model
 Black–Derman–Toy model
 Interest
 Effective interest rate
 Nominal interest rate
 Interest rate basis
 Fisher equation
 Crowding out
 Annual percentage rate
 Interest coverage ratio
 Investment
 Foreign direct investment
 Gold as an investment
 Over-investing
 Leverage
 Long (finance)
 Liquidity
 Margin (finance)
 Mark to market
 Market impact
 Medium of exchange
 Microcredit
 Money
 Money creation
 Currency
 Coin
 Banknote
 Counterfeit
 History of money
 Monetary reform
 Portfolio
Modern portfolio theory
Mutual fund separation theorem
Post-modern portfolio theory
 Reference rate
 Reset
 Return
 Absolute return
 Investment performance
 Relative return
 Risk
 Financial risk
 Risk management
 Financial risk management
 Uncompensated risk
 Risk measure
 Coherent risk measure
 Deviation risk measure
 Distortion risk measure
 Spectral risk measure
 Value at risk
 Expected shortfall
 Entropic value at risk
 Scenario analysis
 Short (finance)
 Speculation
 Day trading
 Position trader
 Spread trade
 Standard of deferred payment
 Store of value
 Time horizon
 Time value of money
 Discounting
 Present value
 Future value
 Net present value
 Internal rate of return
Modified internal rate of return
 Annuity
 Perpetuity
 Trade
 Free trade
 Free market
 Fair trade
 Unit of account
 Volatility
 Yield
 Yield curve

History
 History of finance
 History of banking
 History of insurance
 Tulip mania (Dutch Republic), 1620s/1630s
 South Sea Bubble (UK) & Mississippi Company (France), 1710s; see also Stock market bubble
 Vix pervenit 1745, on usury and other dishonest profit
 Panic of 1837 (US)
 Railway Mania (UK), 1840s
 Erie War (US), 1860s
 Long Depression, 1873–1896 (mainly US and Europe, though other parts of the world were affected)
 Post-World War I hyperinflation; see Hyperinflation and Inflation in the Weimar Republic
 Wall Street Crash of 1929
 Great Depression 1930s
 Bretton Woods Accord 1944
 1973 oil crisis
 1979 energy crisis
 Savings and Loan Crisis 1980s
 Black Monday 1987
 Asian financial crisis 1990s
 Dot-com bubble 1995-2001
 Stock market downturn of 2002
 United States housing bubble
 Financial crisis of 2007–08, followed by the Great Recession

Finance terms by field

Accounting (financial record keeping)

 Auditing
 Accounting software
 Book keeping
 FASB
 Financial accountancy
 Financial statements
 Balance sheet
 Cash flow statement
 Income statement
 Management accounting
 Philosophy of Accounting
 Working capital
 Hedge accounting
 IFRS 9
 Fair value accounting

Banking 
See articles listed under:

Corporate finance 

 Balance sheet analysis
 Financial ratio
 Business plan
 Capital budgeting
 Investment policy
 Business valuation
 Stock valuation
 Fundamental analysis
 Real options
 Valuation topics
 Fisher separation theorem
 Sources of financing
 Securities
 Debt
 Initial public offering
 Capital structure
 Cost of capital
 Weighted average cost of capital
 Modigliani–Miller theorem
 Hamada's equation
 Dividend policy
Dividend
 Dividend tax
 Dividend yield
Modigliani–Miller theorem
 Corporate action
 (Strategic) Financial management
Managerial finance
Management accounting
 Mergers and acquisitions
 leveraged buyout
 takeover
 corporate raid
 Contingent value rights
Real options
Working capital management
Working capital
Current assets
Current liabilities
Return on investment
Return on capital
Return on assets
Return on equity
loan covenant
cash conversion cycle
Cash management 

Inventory optimization
Supply chain management
Just In Time (JIT)
Economic order quantity (EOQ)
Economic production quantity (EPQ)
Economic batch quantity
Credit (finance)
Credit scoring
Default risk
Discounts and allowances
Factoring (trade) & Supply chain finance

Investment management

 Active management
 Efficient market hypothesis
 Portfolio
 Modern portfolio theory
 Capital asset pricing model
 Arbitrage pricing theory
 Passive management
 Index fund
 Activist shareholder
 Mutual fund
 Open-end fund
 Closed-end fund
 List of mutual-fund families
 Financial engineering
 Long-Term Capital Management
Hedge fund
 Hedge
#Quantitative investing, below

Personal finance 

 529 plan (US college savings)
 ABLE account (US plan for benefit of individuals with disabilities)
 Asset allocation
 Asset location
 Budget
 Coverdell Education Savings Account (Coverdell ESAs, formerly known as Education IRAs)
 Credit and debt
 Credit card
 Debt consolidation
 Mortgage loan
 Continuous-repayment mortgage
 Debit card
 Direct deposit
 Employment contract
 Commission
 Employee stock option
 Employee or fringe benefit
 Health insurance
 Paycheck
 Salary
 Wage
 Financial literacy
 Insurance
 Predatory lending
 Retirement plan
 Australia – Superannuation in Australia
 Canada
 Registered retirement savings plan
 Tax-free savings account
 Japan – Nippon individual savings account
 New Zealand – KiwiSaver
 United Kingdom
 Individual savings account
 Self-invested personal pension
 United States
 401(a)
 401(k)
 403(b)
 457 plan
 Keogh plan
 Individual retirement account
 Roth IRA
 Traditional IRA
 SEP IRA
 SIMPLE IRA
 Pension
 Simple living
 Social security
 Tax advantage
 Wealth
Comparison of accounting software
Personal financial management
Investment club
Collective investment scheme

Public finance 

 Central bank
 Federal Reserve
 Fractional-reserve banking
 Deposit creation multiplier
 Tax
 Capital gains tax
 Estate tax (and inheritance tax)
 Gift tax
 Income tax
 Inheritance tax
 Payroll tax
 Property tax (including land value tax)
 Sales tax (including value added tax, excise tax, and use tax)
 Transfer tax (including stamp duty)
 Tax advantage
 Tax, tariff and trade
 Tax amortization benefit
 Crowding out
 Industrial policy
 Agricultural policy
 Currency union
 Monetary reform

Risk management
See articles listed under:

Constraint finance
 Environmental finance
 Feminist economics
 Green economics
 Islamic economics
 Uneconomic growth
 Value of Earth
 Value of life

Insurance 

 Actuarial science
 Annuities
 Catastrophe modeling
 Earthquake loss
 Extended coverage
 Insurable interest
 Insurable risk
 Insurance
 Health insurance
 Disability insurance
 Accident insurance
 Flexible spending account
 Health savings account
 Long term care insurance
 Medical savings account
 Life insurance
 Life insurance tax shelter
 Permanent life insurance
 Term life insurance
 Universal life insurance
 Variable universal life insurance
 Whole life insurance
 Property insurance
 Auto insurance
 Boiler insurance
 Business interruption insurance
 Condo insurance 
 Earthquake insurance
 Home insurance
 Title insurance
 Pet insurance
 Renters' insurance
 Casualty insurance
 Fidelity bond
 Liability insurance
 Political risk insurance
 Surety bond
 Terrorism insurance
 Credit insurance
 Trade credit insurance
 Payment protection insurance
 Credit derivative
 Mid-term adjustment
 Reinsurance
 Self insurance
 Travel insurance
 Niche insurance
 Insurance contract
 Loss payee clause
 Risk Retention Group

Economics and finance

Finance-related areas of economics
 Financial economics
 Monetary economics
 Mathematical economics
 Managerial economics
 Economic growth theory
 Decision theory
 Game theory
 Experimental economics / Experimental finance
 Behavioral economics / Behavioral finance

Corporate finance theory

Fisher separation theorem
Modigliani–Miller theorem
Theory of the firm
The Theory of Investment Value
Agency theory
Capital structure

Capital structure substitution theory
Pecking order theory
Market timing hypothesis
Trade-off theory of capital structure
Merton model
Tax shield
Dividend policy

Walter model
Gordon model
Lintner model
Residuals theory
Clientele effect
Dividend puzzle

Dividend tax
Capital budgeting (valuation)

Clean surplus accounting
Residual income valuation
Economic value added / Market value added
T-model
Adjusted present value
uncertainty
Penalized present value
Expected commercial value
Risk-adjusted net present value
Contingent claim valuation
Real options
Monte Carlo methods
Risk management

Hedging irrelevance proposition
Risk modeling
Risk-adjusted return on capital

Asset pricing theory

Value (economics)
Fair value
Intrinsic value
Market price
Expected value
Opportunity cost
Risk premium
#Underlying theory below
Financial markets
Stylized fact
Regulatory economics

Market microstructure 
Walrasian auction
Fisher market
Arrow-Debreu market
Agent-based model
Representative agent
Heterogeneity in economics
Heterogeneous agent model

Artificial financial market
Equilibrium price
market efficiency
economic equilibrium
rational expectations
Risk factor (finance)
General equilibrium theory
Supply and demand
Competitive equilibrium
Economic equilibrium
Partial equilibrium
Arbitrage-free price 
Rational pricing
§ Arbitrage free pricing
§ Risk neutral valuation
Contingent claim analysis
Brownian model of financial markets
Complete market & Incomplete markets
Utility
Risk aversion
Expected utility hypothesis
Utility maximization problem
Marginal utility
Quasilinear utility
Generalized expected utility
Economic efficiency
Efficient-market hypothesis
efficient frontier
Production–possibility frontier
Allocative efficiency
Pareto efficiency
Productive efficiency
State prices
Arrow–Debreu model
Stochastic discount factor
Pricing kernel
application:

Fundamental theorem of asset pricing 
 Rational pricing 
 Arbitrage-free 
No free lunch with vanishing risk
Self-financing portfolio
Stochastic dominance
Marginal conditional stochastic dominance
Martingale pricing
Brownian model of financial markets
Random walk hypothesis
Risk-neutral measure 
Martingale (probability theory)
Sigma-martingale
Semimartingale
Quantum finance

Asset pricing models
Equilibrium pricing
Equities; foreign exchange and commodities
Capital asset pricing model
Consumption-based CAPM
Intertemporal CAPM
Single-index model
Multiple factor models
Fama–French three-factor model
Carhart four-factor model
Arbitrage pricing theory
Bonds; other interest rate instruments 
Vasicek 
Rendleman–Bartter
Cox–Ingersoll–Ross
Risk neutral pricing
Equities; foreign exchange and commodities; interest rates
Black–Scholes
Black
Garman–Kohlhagen
Heston
CEV
SABR
Bonds; other interest rate instruments 
Ho–Lee 
Hull–White 
Black–Derman–Toy 
Black–Karasinski
Kalotay–Williams–Fabozzi
Longstaff–Schwartz
Chen
Rendleman–Bartter
Heath–Jarrow–Morton
Cheyette
Brace–Gatarek–Musiela 
LIBOR market model

Mathematics and finance

Time value of money 

 Present value
 Future value
 Discounting
 Net present value
 Internal rate of return
 Annuity
 Perpetuity

Financial mathematics

Mathematical tools 
Probability
Probability distribution
Binomial distribution
Log-normal distribution
Poisson distribution
Stochastic calculus
Brownian motion
Geometric Brownian motion
Cameron–Martin theorem
Feynman–Kac formula
Girsanov's theorem
Itô's lemma
Martingale representation theorem
Radon–Nikodym derivative
Stochastic differential equations
Stochastic process
Jump process
Lévy process
Markov process
Ornstein–Uhlenbeck process
Wiener process
Monte Carlo methods
Low-discrepancy sequence
Monte Carlo integration
Quasi-Monte Carlo method
Random number generation
Partial differential equations
Finite difference method
Heat equation
Numerical partial differential equations
Crank–Nicolson method
Finite difference method: Numerical analysis
Volatility
ARCH model
GARCH model
Stochastic volatility
Stochastic volatility jump

Derivatives pricing 

Underlying logic (see also #Economics and finance above)
 Rational pricing 
Risk-neutral measure 
Arbitrage-free pricing
Brownian model of financial markets
Martingale pricing
Forward contract
Forward contract pricing
Futures
Futures contract pricing
Options (incl. Real options and ESOs)
Valuation of options
 Black–Scholes formula
 Approximations for American options
Barone-Adesi and Whaley
Bjerksund and Stensland
Black's approximation
Optimal stopping
Roll–Geske–Whaley
 Black model
 Binomial options model
 Finite difference methods for option pricing
 Garman–Kohlhagen model
 The Greeks
 Lattice model (finance)
 Margrabe's formula
 Monte Carlo methods for option pricing
Monte Carlo methods in finance
Quasi-Monte Carlo methods in finance
Least Square Monte Carlo for American options
 Trinomial tree
 Volatility
 Implied volatility
 Historical volatility
 Volatility smile (&  Volatility surface)
 Stochastic volatility
 Constant elasticity of variance model
 Heston model
 SABR volatility model
 Local volatility
Implied binomial tree
Implied trinomial tree
Edgeworth binomial tree
Johnson binomial tree
Swaps
Swap valuation

Multi-curve framework

Interest rate derivatives (bond options, swaptions, caps and floors, and others)
Black model
caps and floors
swaptions
Bond options
Short-rate models (generally applied via lattice based- and specialized simulation-models, although "Black like" formulae exist in some cases.)
Rendleman–Bartter model
Vasicek model
Ho–Lee model
Hull–White model
Cox–Ingersoll–Ross model
Black–Karasinski model
Black–Derman–Toy model
Kalotay–Williams–Fabozzi model
Longstaff–Schwartz model
Chen model
Forward rate / Forward curve -based models (Application as per short-rate models)
LIBOR market model (also called: Brace–Gatarek–Musiela Model, BGM)
Heath–Jarrow–Morton Model (HJM)
Cheyette model
Valuation adjustments
Credit valuation adjustment
XVA
Yield curve modelling
Multi-curve framework
Bootstrapping (finance)

Nelson-Siegel

Portfolio mathematics
#Mathematical techniques below
#Quantitative investing below

Portfolio optimization
§ Optimization methods
§ Mathematical tools
Merton's portfolio problem
Kelly criterion
Roy's safety-first criterion
Specific applications:
Black–Litterman model
Universal portfolio algorithm
Markowitz model
Treynor–Black model

Financial markets

Market and instruments 
 Capital markets
 Securities
 Financial markets
 Primary market
 Initial public offering
 Aftermarket
 Free market
 Bull market
 Bear market
 Bear market rally
 Market maker
 Dow Jones Industrial Average
 Nasdaq
 List of stock exchanges
 List of stock market indices
 List of corporations by market capitalization
 Value Line Composite Index

Equity market 

 Stock market
 Stock
 Common stock
 Preferred stock
 Treasury stock
 Equity investment
 Index investing
 Private Equity
 Financial reports and statements
 Fundamental analysis
 Dividend
 Dividend yield
 Stock split

Equity valuation 

 Dow theory
 Elliott wave principle
 Economic value added
 Fibonacci retracement
 Gordon model
 Growth stock
 PEG ratio
 PVGO
 Mergers and acquisitions
 Leveraged buyout
 Takeover
 Corporate raid
 PE ratio
 Market capitalization
 Income per share
 Stock valuation
 Technical analysis
 Chart patterns
 V-trend
 Paper valuation

Investment theory 

Behavioral finance
Dead cat bounce
Efficient market hypothesis
Market microstructure
Stock market crash
Stock market bubble
January effect
Mark Twain effect
Quantitative behavioral finance
Quantitative analysis (finance)
Statistical arbitrage

Bond market 

 Bond (finance)
 Zero-coupon bond
 Junk bonds
 Convertible bond
 Accrual bond
 Municipal bond
 Sovereign bond
 Bond valuation
 Yield to maturity
 Bond duration
 Bond convexity
 Fixed income

Money market 

 Repurchase agreement
 International Money Market
 Currency
 Exchange rate
 International currency codes
 Table of historical exchange rates

Commodity market 

 Commodity
 Asset
 Commodity Futures Trading Commission
 Commodity trade
 Drawdowns
 Forfaiting
 Fundamental analysis
 Futures contract
 Fungibility
 Gold as an investment
 Hedging
 Jesse Lauriston Livermore
 List of traded commodities
 Ownership equity
 Position trader
 Risk (Futures)
 Seasonal traders
 Seasonal spread trading
 Slippage
 Speculation
 Spread trade
 Technical analysis
 Breakout
 Bear market
 Bottom (technical analysis)
 Bull market
 MACD
 Moving average
 Open Interest
 Parabolic SAR
 Point and figure charts
 Resistance
 RSI
 Stochastic oscillator
 Stop loss
 Support
 Top (technical analysis)
 Trade
 Trend

Derivatives market 

Derivative (finance)
(see also Financial mathematics topics; Derivatives pricing)
 Underlying instrument

Forward markets and contracts

 Forward contract

Futures markets and contracts

 Backwardation
 Contango
 Futures contract
 Financial future
Currency future
Interest rate future
Single-stock futures
Stock market index future
 Futures exchange

Option markets and contracts 

 Options
 Stock option
 Box spread
 Call option
 Put option
 Strike price
 Put–call parity
 The Greeks
 Black–Scholes formula
 Black model
 Binomial options model
 Implied volatility
 Option time value
Moneyness
At-the-money
In-the-money
Out-of-the-money
 Straddle
 Option style
 Vanilla option
 Exotic option
 Binary option
 European option
 Interest rate floor
 Interest rate cap
 Bermudan option
 American option
 Quanto option
 Asian option
 Employee stock option
 Warrants
 Foreign exchange option
 Interest rate options
 Bond options
 Real options
 Options on futures

Swap markets and contracts 

 Swap (finance)
 Interest rate swap
 Basis swap
 Asset swap
 Forex swap
 Stock swap
 Equity swap
 Currency swap
 Variance swap

Derivative markets by underlyings

Equity derivatives 

Contract for difference (CFD)
Exchange-traded fund (ETF)
Closed-end fund
Inverse exchange-traded fund
Equity options
Equity swap
Real estate investment trust (REIT)
Warrants
Covered warrant

Interest rate derivatives 

 LIBOR
 Forward rate agreement
 Interest rate swap
 Interest rate cap
 Exotic interest rate option
 Bond option
 Interest rate future
 Money market instruments
 Range accrual Swaps/Notes/Bonds
 In-arrears Swap
 Constant maturity swap (CMS) or Constant Treasury Swap (CTS) derivatives (swaps, caps, floors)
 Interest rate Swaption
 Bermudan swaptions
 Cross currency swaptions
 Power Reverse Dual Currency note (PRDC or Turbo)
 Target redemption note (TARN)
 CMS steepener
 Snowball
 Inverse floater
 Strips of Collateralized mortgage obligation
 Ratchet caps and floors

Credit derivatives 

 Credit default swap
 Collateralized debt obligation
 Credit default option
 Total return swap
 Securitization
 Strip financing

Foreign exchange derivative 

Basis swap
Currency future
Currency swap
Foreign exchange binary option
Foreign exchange forward
Foreign exchange option
Forward exchange rate
Foreign exchange swap
Foreign exchange hedge
Non-deliverable forward
Power reverse dual-currency note

Financial regulation 
 Corporate governance
 Financial regulation
 Bank regulation
 Banking license
 License

Designations and accreditation 

 Certified Financial Planner
 Chartered Financial Analyst
 CFA Institute
 Chartered Alternative Investment Analyst
 Professional risk manager
 Chartered Financial Consultant
 Canadian Securities Institute
 Independent financial adviser
 Chartered Insurance Institute
 Financial risk manager
 Chartered Market Technician
 Certified Financial Technician

Litigation 
 Liabilities Subject to Compromise

Fraud 
 Forex scam
 Insider trading
 Legal origins theory
 Petition mill
 Ponzi scheme

Industry bodies
 International Swaps and Derivatives Association
 National Association of Securities Dealers

Regulatory bodies

International
 Bank for International Settlements
 International Organization of Securities Commissions
 Security Commission
 Basel Committee on Banking Supervision
 Basel Accords – Basel I, Basel II, Basel III
 International Association of Insurance Supervisors
 International Accounting Standards Board

European Union
 European Securities Committee (EU)
 Committee of European Securities Regulators (EU)

Regulatory bodies by country

United Kingdom
 Financial Conduct Authority
 Prudential Regulation Authority (United Kingdom)

United States
 Commodity Futures Trading Commission
 Federal Reserve
 Federal Trade Commission
 Municipal Securities Rulemaking Board
 Office of the Comptroller of the Currency
 Securities and Exchange Commission

United States legislation
 Glass–Steagall Act (US)
 Gramm–Leach–Bliley Act (US)
 Sarbanes–Oxley Act (US)
 Securities Act of 1933 (US)
 Securities Exchange Act of 1934 (US)
 Investment Advisers Act of 1940 (US)
 USA PATRIOT Act

Actuarial topics
 Actuarial topics

Valuation

Underlying theory
Value (economics)
Valuation (finance) and specifically § Valuation overview
"The Theory of Investment Value"

Valuation risk
Real versus nominal value (economics)
Real prices and ideal prices
Fair value
Fair value accounting
Intrinsic value
Market price
Value in use
Fairness opinion
Asset pricing (see also #Asset pricing theory above)
Equilibrium price
market efficiency
economic equilibrium
rational expectations
Arbitrage-free price

Context
 (Corporate) Bonds
 Bond valuation

 Equity valuation
 #Equity valuation above
 Fundamental analysis
 Stock valuation
 Business valuation
 
 
 Capital budgeting and 
 The Theory of Investment Value
Real estate valuation
Real estate appraisal
Real estate economics

Considerations
Bonds
covenants and indentures
secured / unsecured debt
senior / subordinated debt
embedded options
Equity
 Minimum acceptable rate of return
 Margin of safety (financial)
 Enterprise value
 Sum-of-the-parts analysis
Conglomerate discount
 Minority discount
 Control premium
 Accretion/dilution analysis
 Certainty equivalent
 Haircut (finance)
 Paper valuation

Discounted cash flow valuation 

 Bond valuation
Modeling

embedded options:
Pull to par
 
Results
Clean price
Dirty price
Yield to maturity
Coupon yield
Current yield
Duration
Convexity
embedded options:
Option-adjusted spread
effective duration
effective convexity
Cash flows
Principal (finance)
Coupon (bond)
Fixed rate bond
Floating rate note
Zero-coupon bond
Accrual bond
sinking fund provisions
Real estate valuation

Income approach
Net Operating Income

German income approach
 Equity valuation
Results
 Net present value
 Adjusted present value
 Equivalent Annual Cost
 Payback period
 Discounted payback period
 Internal rate of return
 Modified Internal Rate of Return
 Return on investment
 Profitability index
Specific models and approaches 
 Dividend discount model
 Gordon growth model
 Market value added / Economic value added
 Residual income valuation
 First Chicago Method
 rNPV
 Fed model
 Chepakovich valuation model
 Sum of perpetuities method
 Benjamin Graham formula
 LBO valuation model
 Goldman Sachs asset management factor model
 Cash flows
 Cash flow forecasting
 EBIDTA
 NOPAT
 Free cash flow
 Free cash flow to firm
 Free cash flow to equity
 Dividends

Relative valuation 

Bonds
 
 Yield spread
 I-spread
 Option-adjusted spread
 Z-spread
 Asset swap spread
 Credit spread (bond)
Bond credit rating
Altman Z-score
Ohlson O-score
Book value
Debt-to-equity ratio
Debt-to-capital ratio
Current ratio
Quick ratio
Debt ratio
Real estate
 Capitalization rate
 Gross rent multiplier
 Sales comparison approach
 
 Cash on cash return
Equity
 Financial ratio
 Market-based valuation
 Comparable company analysis
 Dividend yield
 Yield gap
 Return on equity
 DuPont analysis
 PE ratio
PEG ratio
Cyclically adjusted price-to-earnings ratio
PVGO
 P/B ratio
 Price to cash based earnings
 Price to Sales
 EV/EBITDA
 EV/Sales
 Stock image
 Valuation using the Market Penetration Model
 Graham number
 Tobin's q

Contingent claim valuation 

Valuation techniques
general
Valuation of options

#Derivatives pricing above
as typically employed
Real options valuation

Monte Carlo methods in finance
Applications
Corporate investments and projects
Real options 

Contingent value rights

structured finance investments (funding dependent)
special purpose entities (funding dependent)
Balance sheet assets and liabilities
warrants and other convertible securities
securities with embedded options such as callable bonds
employee stock options

Other approaches 
"Fundamentals"-based (relying on accounting information)
T-model
Residual income valuation
Clean surplus accounting
Net asset value method
Excess earnings method
Historical earnings valuation
Future maintainable earnings valuation
Graham number

Financial modeling 

 Cash flow
 Cash flow forecasting
 Cash flow statement
 Operating cash flow
 EBIDTA
 
 NOPAT
 Free cash flow
 Free cash flow to firm
 Free cash flow to equity
 Dividends
 Cash is king
 Mid-year adjustment
 Owner earnings
 Required return (i.e. discount rate)

Cost of capital
Weighted average cost of capital
Cost of equity
Cost of debt
Capital asset pricing model

Hamada's equation
Pure play method
Arbitrage pricing theory

Total Beta
T-model
cash-flow T-model
 Terminal value

Forecast period (finance)
long term growth rate

Forecasted financial statements
Financial forecast

Revenue
Revenue model

Net sales
Costs
Profit margin
Gross margin
Net margin
Cost of goods sold
Operating expenses
Operating ratio
Cost driver
Fixed cost
Variable cost
Overhead cost
Value chain
activity based costing
common-size analysis
Profit model
Capital
Capital structure
common-size analysis
Equity (finance)
Shareholders' equity
Book value
Retained earnings
Financial capital
Long term asset / Fixed asset
Fixed-asset turnover
Long-term liabilities
Debt-to-equity ratio
Debt-to-capital ratio
Working capital
Current asset
Current liability
Inventory turnover / Days in inventory, Cost of goods sold
Debtor & Creditor days
Days sales outstanding / Days payable outstanding

Portfolio theory

General concepts
Portfolio (finance)
Portfolio manager 
Investment management
Active management
Passive management (Buy and hold)
Index fund
Core & Satellite
Smart beta
Expense ratio
Investment style
 Value investing
 Contrarian investing
 Growth investing
 CAN SLIM
 Index investing
 Magic formula investing
 Momentum investing
 Quality investing
 Style investing
 Factor investing
Investment strategy
Benchmark-driven investment strategy
Liability-driven investment strategy

Investor profile
Rate of return on a portfolio / Investment performance
Risk return ratio
Risk–return spectrum
Risk factor (finance)
Portfolio optimization
Diversification (finance)
Asset classes
Exter's Pyramid
Asset allocation
Tactical asset allocation
Global tactical asset allocation
Strategic asset allocation
Dynamic asset allocation
Sector rotation
Correlation & covariance
Covariance matrix
Correlation matrix
Risk-free interest rate
Leverage (finance)
Utility function
Intertemporal portfolio choice
Portfolio insurance
Constant proportion portfolio insurance

Quantitative investment / Quantitative fund (see below)
Uncompensated risk

Modern portfolio theory

Portfolio optimization
Risk return ratio
Risk–return spectrum
Economic efficiency
Efficient-market hypothesis
Random walk hypothesis
Utility maximization problem
Markowitz model
Merton's portfolio problem
Kelly criterion
Roy's safety-first criterion
Theory and results (derivation of the CAPM)
Equilibrium price
Market price
Systematic risk
Risk factor (finance)
Idiosyncratic risk / Specific risk
Mean-variance analysis (Two-moment decision model)
Efficient frontier (Mean variance efficiency)
Feasible set
Mutual fund separation theorem
Separation property (finance)
Tangent portfolio
Market portfolio
Beta (finance)
Fama–MacBeth regression
Hamada's equation

Capital allocation line
Capital market line
Security characteristic line 
Capital asset pricing model
Single-index model
Security market line
Roll's critique
Related measures
Alpha (finance)
Sharpe ratio
Treynor ratio
Jensen's alpha
Optimization models
Markowitz model
Treynor–Black model

Equilibrium pricing models (CAPM and extensions)
Capital asset pricing model (CAPM)
Consumption-based capital asset pricing model (CCAPM)
Intertemporal CAPM (ICAPM)
Single-index model
Multiple factor models (see Risk factor (finance))
Fama–French three-factor model
Carhart four-factor model
Arbitrage pricing theory (APT)

Post-modern portfolio theory

Approaches
Behavioral portfolio theory
Stochastic portfolio theory
Chance-constrained portfolio selection
Maslowian portfolio theory
Dedicated portfolio theory (fixed income specific)
Risk parity
Tail risk parity
Optimization considerations
Pareto efficiency
Bayesian efficiency
Multiple-criteria decision analysis
Multi-objective optimization
Stochastic dominance
Second-order Stochastic dominance
Marginal conditional stochastic dominance
Downside risk
Volatility skewness
Semivariance
Expected shortfall (ES; also called conditional value at risk (CVaR), average value at risk (AVaR), expected tail loss (ETL))
Tail value at risk
Statistical dispersion
Discounted maximum loss
Indifference price
Measures
Dual-beta
Downside beta
Upside beta
Upside potential ratio
Upside risk
Downside risk
Sortino ratio
Omega ratio
Bias ratio
Information ratio
Active return
Active risk
Deviation risk measure
Distortion risk measure
Spectral risk measure
Optimization models
Black–Litterman model
Universal portfolio algorithm

Performance measurement

Alpha (finance)
Beta (finance)
Performance attribution
Market timing
Stock selection
Fixed-income attribution
Benchmark
Lipper average
Returns-based style analysis
Rate of return on a portfolio
Holding period return
Tracking error
Attribution analysis
Style drift
Returns-based style analysis
Simple Dietz method
Modified Dietz method
Modigliani risk-adjusted performance
Upside potential ratio
Maximum Downside Exposure
Maximum drawdown
Sterling ratio
Sharpe ratio
Treynor ratio
Jensen's alpha
Bias ratio
V2 ratio
Calmar ratio (hedge fund specific)

Mathematical techniques

Quadratic programming
Critical line method
Nonlinear programming
Mixed integer programming
Stochastic programming (§ Multistage portfolio optimization)
Copula (probability theory)  (§ Quantitative finance)
Principal component analysis (§ Quantitative finance)
Deterministic global optimization
Genetic algorithm
Machine learning (§ Applications)
Artificial neural network

Quantitative investing

Quantitative investing
Quantitative fund
 

Trading:
Automated trading
High-frequency trading
Algorithmic trading
Program trading
Systematic trading

Trading strategy
Mirror trading
Copy trading
Social trading
VWAP
TWAP
Electronic trading platform
Statistical arbitrage
Portfolio optimization:
 
 
Black–Litterman model
Universal portfolio algorithm
Markowitz model
Treynor–Black model
other models
Factor investing
low-volatility investing
value investing
momentum investing
Alpha generation platform
Kelly criterion
Roy's safety-first criterion
Risks:
Best execution
Implementation shortfall
Trading curb
Market impact
Market depth
Slippage (finance)
Transaction costs
Discussion:

2010 flash crash

Leading companies:
Prediction Company
Renaissance Technologies 
D. E. Shaw & Co
AQR Capital
Barclays Investment Bank
Cantab Capital Partners
Robeco
Jane Street Capital

Financial software tools
 Straight Through Processing Software
 Technical Analysis Software
 Fundamental Analysis Software
 Algorithmic trading
 Electronic trading platform
 List of numerical-analysis software
 Comparison of numerical-analysis software

Financial modeling applications

Corporate Finance 
Business valuation / stock valuation - especially via discounted cash flow, but including other valuation approaches
Scenario planning and management decision making ("what is"; "what if"; "what has to be done")
Capital budgeting, including cost of capital (i.e. WACC) calculations
Financial statement analysis / ratio analysis (including of operating- and finance leases, and R&D)
Revenue related: forecasting, analysis
Project finance modeling
Cash flow forecasting
Credit decisioning: Credit analysis, Consumer credit risk; impairment- and provision-modeling 
Working capital- and treasury management; asset and liability management
Management accounting: Activity-based costing, Profitability analysis, Cost analysis,  Whole-life cost

Quantitative finance 
Option pricing and calculation of their "Greeks"
Other derivatives, especially interest rate derivatives, credit derivatives and exotic derivatives
Modeling the term structure of interest rates (bootstrapping / multi-curves, short-rate models, HJM framework) and credit spreads
Credit valuation adjustment, CVA, as well as the various XVA
Credit risk, counterparty credit risk, and regulatory capital:  EAD, PD, LGD, PFE
Structured product design and manufacture
Portfolio optimization and Quantitative investing more generally; see further re optimization methods employed.
Financial risk modeling: value at risk (parametric- and / or historical, CVaR, EVT), stress testing, "sensitivities" analysis

Financial institutions 
Financial institutions
 Bank
 List of banks
 List of banks in the Arab World
 List of banks in Africa
 List of banks in the Americas
 List of banks in Asia 
 List of banks in Europe
 List of banks in Oceania
 List of international banking institutions
 Advising bank
 Central bank
 List of central banks
 Commercial bank
 Community development bank
 Cooperative bank
 Custodian bank
 Depository bank
 Ethical bank
 Investment bank
 Islamic banking
 Merchant bank
 Microcredit
 Mutual savings bank
 National bank
 Offshore bank
 Private bank
 Savings bank
 Swiss bank
 Bank holding company
 Building society
 Broker
 Broker-dealer
 Brokerage firm
 Commodity broker
 Insurance broker
 Prime brokerage
 Retail broker
 Stockbroker
 Clearing house
 Commercial lender
 Community development financial institution
 Credit rating agency
 Credit union
 Diversified financial
 Edge Act Corporation
 Export Credit Agencies
 Financial adviser
 Financial intermediary
 Financial planner
 Futures exchange
 List of futures exchanges
 Government sponsored enterprise
 Hard money lender
 Independent financial adviser
 Industrial loan company
 Insurance company
 Investment adviser
 Investment company
 Investment trust
 Large and Complex Financial Institutions
 Mutual fund
 Non-banking financial company
 Savings and loan association
 Stock exchange
 List of stock exchanges
 Trust company

Education
For the typical finance career path and corresponding education requirements see:
Financial analyst generally, and esp. § Qualification, discussing various investment, banking, and corporate roles (i.e. financial management, corporate finance, investment banking, securities analysis & valuation, portfolio & investment management, credit analysis, working capital & treasury management; see )
Business education lists undergraduate degrees in business, commerce, accounting and economics; "finance" may be taken as a major in most of these, whereas "quantitative finance" is almost invariably postgraduate, following a math-focused Bachelors; the most common degrees for (entry level) investment, banking, and corporate roles are:
Bachelor of Business Administration (BBA)
Bachelor of Commerce (BCom)
Bachelor of Accountancy (B.Acc)
Bachelor of Economics (B.Econ)
Bachelor of Finance - the undergraduate version of the MSF below 
The tagged BS / BA "in Finance",  or less common, "in Investment Management" or "in Personal Finance"
At the postgraduate level, the MBA, MCom and MSM (and recently the Master of Applied Economics) similarly offer training in finance generally; at this level there are also the following specifically focused master's degrees, with MSF the broadest - see  for their focus and inter-relation:
Master of Applied Finance (M.App.Fin)
Master of Computational Finance
Master's in Corporate Finance
Master of Finance (M.Fin, MIF)
 Master's in Financial Analysis
Master of Financial Economics
Master of Financial Engineering (MFE)
Master of Financial Planning
Master's in Financial Management
Master of Financial Mathematics
Master's in Financial Risk Management
Master's in Investment Management
Master of Mathematical Finance
Master of Quantitative Finance (MQF)
Master of Science in Finance (MSF, MSc Finance)
Master of Science in Global Finance
MS in Fintech
Doctoral-training in finance is usually a requirement for academia, but not relevant to industry
quants often enter the profession with PhDs in disciplines such as physics, mathematics, engineering, and computer science, and learn finance "on the job”
as an academic field, finance theory is studied and developed within the disciplines of management, (financial) economics, accountancy, and applied / financial mathematics.
For specialized roles, there are various Professional Certifications in financial services (see #Designations and accreditation above); the best recognized are arguably:
Association of Corporate Treasurers (MCT / FCT)
Certificate in Quantitative Finance (CQF)
Certified Financial Planner (CFP)
Certified International Investment Analyst (CIIA)
Certified Treasury Professional (CTP)
Chartered Alternative Investment Analyst (CAIA)
Chartered Financial Analyst (CFA)
Chartered Wealth Manager (CWM)
CISI Diploma in Capital Markets (MCSI)
Financial Risk Manager (FRM)
Professional Risk Manager (PRM)
Various organizations offer executive education, CPD, or other focused training programs, including:
Amsterdam Institute of Finance
Canadian Securities Institute
Chartered Institute for Securities & Investment
GARP
ICMA Centre
The London Institute of Banking & Finance
New York Institute of Finance
PRMIA 
South African Institute of Financial Markets
Swiss Finance Institute
See also qualifications in related fields:

Actuarial credentialing and exams
Business education

Economics education

Related lists 
 Index of accounting articles
 Outline of business management
 Outline of marketing
 Outline of economics
 Outline of production
 List of international trade topics
 List of business law topics
 List of business theorists
 Actuarial topics

References

External links 

 Wharton Finance Knowledge Project –  finance knowledge for students, teachers, and self-learners.
 Prof. Aswath Damodaran - financial theory, with a focus in Corporate Finance, Valuation and Investments. Updated Data, Excel Spreadsheets. 
Web Sites for Discerning Finance Students (Prof. John M. Wachowicz) -Links to finance web sites, grouped by topic 
studyfinance.com - introductory finance web site at the University of Arizona 
SECLaw.com - law of the financial markets
TheStreet.com Glossary - stock market related definitions 

Finance
Finance
 
Finance topics